The Mariana and Palau Islands campaign, also known as Operation Forager, was an offensive launched by United States forces against Imperial Japanese forces in the Mariana Islands and Palau in the Pacific Ocean between June and November 1944 during the Pacific War. The United States offensive, under the overall command of Chester W. Nimitz, followed the Gilbert and Marshall Islands campaign and was intended to neutralize Japanese bases in the central Pacific, support the Allied drive to retake the Philippines, and provide bases for a strategic bombing campaign against Japan.

The United States invasion force was supported by a massive combat force.  The Fifth Fleet was commanded by Admiral Raymond A. Spruance.  Task Force 58, commanded by Vice Admiral Marc Mitscher, consisted of 15 carriers, 7 battleships, 11 cruisers, 86 destroyers and over 900 planes.  The invasion force, commanded by Vice Admiral Richmond K. Turner, consisted of 56 attack transports, 84 landing craft and over 127,000 troops.

Beginning the offensive, United States Marine Corps and United States Army forces, with support from the United States Navy, executed landings on Saipan in June 1944. In response, the Imperial Japanese Navy's Combined Fleet sortied to attack the U.S. Navy fleet supporting the landings.  In the resulting aircraft carrier Battle of the Philippine Sea (the so-called "Great Marianas Turkey Shoot") on 19–20 June, the Japanese naval forces were decisively defeated with heavy and irreplaceable losses to their carrier-borne and land-based aircraft.

U.S. forces executed landings on Saipan in June 1944 and Guam and Tinian in July 1944.  After heavy fighting, Saipan was secured in July and Guam and Tinian in August 1944.  The U.S. then constructed airfields on Saipan and Tinian where B-29s were based to conduct strategic bombing missions against the Japanese home islands until the end of World War II, including the nuclear attacks on Hiroshima and Nagasaki.

In the meantime, in order to secure the flank for U.S. forces preparing to attack Japanese forces in the Philippines, in September 1944, U.S. Marine and Army forces landed on the islands of Peleliu and Angaur in Palau.  After heavy and intense combat on Peleliu and Angaur, both islands were finally secured by U.S. forces in November 1944, while the main Japanese garrison in the Palaus on Koror was passed by altogether, only to surrender in August 1945 with the Empire’s capitulation.

Following their landings in the Mariana and Palau Islands, Allied forces continued their ultimately successful campaign against Japan by landing in the Philippines in October 1944 and the Volcano and Ryukyu Islands beginning in January 1945.

Operations 
 Battle of Saipan, 15 June – 9 July 1944
 Battle of Guam, 21 July – 10 August 1944
 Battle of Tinian, 24 July – 1 August 1944
 Battle of Peleliu, 15 September – 27 November 1944
 Battle of Angaur, 17 September – 22 October 1944

See also 
 West Loch disaster

References

Books

Web

External links 

Conflicts in 1944
History of the Northern Mariana Islands
Pacific Ocean theatre of World War II
United States Marine Corps in World War II
Wars involving Palau
Campaigns of World War II
Battles and operations of World War II involving Japan